United Front: Brass Ecstasy at Newport is a live album by trumpeter Dave Douglas' Brass Ecstasy released on the Greenleaf Music label in 2011.

Reception

In JazzTimes, Brian Zimmerman wrote "The songs on this album are imbued with the kind of energy that only a live performance can create. Listen closely and you’ll hear the audience shout and scream their approval. And believe me – after hearing this album, you’ll probably do the same". On All About Jazz Mark Corroto said "This unique lineup matches the marching sounds of trumpet, tuba, and trombone with of Nasheet Waits' full drum kit, while Vincent Chancey's French horn balances the outside parade with the inside chamber, and does so nicely. Waits is more than a timekeeper, he's the turbo engine, with Chancey providing the polishing agent to the sound".

Track listing
All compositions by Dave Douglas except as indicated
 "Spirit Moves" - 5:03
 "Rava" - 10:05
 "Fats" - 3:36
 "I'm So Lonesome I Could Cry" (Hank Williams) - 7:31
 "United Front" - 6:18
 "Bowie" - 12:28

Personnel
Dave Douglas: trumpet
Vincent Chancey: French horn
Luis Bonilla: trombone
Marcus Rojas: tuba
Nasheet Waits: drums

References

Dave Douglas (trumpeter) live albums
2011 live albums
Greenleaf Music live albums
Albums recorded at the Newport Jazz Festival